Albertus LeRoy (A.L.) Freehafer (February 12, 1868, in Butler, Richland County, Ohio – October 28, 1940, in Payette, Idaho) was a Democratic politician from Idaho. He was a son of Andrew Freehafer and Martha Ellen Kinton, both natives of Richland County, Ohio.

From 1907 to 1908, he represented Washington County, Idaho, as a member of the House of Representatives, and was a minority leader in the assembly. He served two terms as a state senator. As senator, he represented Washington County, Idaho, from 1909 to 1912 and Payette County, Idaho, from 1929 to 1934.

In 1911, Senator Freehafer introduced a bill, written by L.L. Burtenshaw, to the state legislature of Idaho to create Adams County. The bill passed on March 3, 1911.

In 1924, A.L. Freehafer was a Democratic nominee for Governor of Idaho, but finished behind H.F. Samuels, the Progressive candidate, losing by only 81 points. The Republican governor, Charles C. Moore, came in third.

Freehafer is the grandfather of James (Jim) Albertus McClure, a former Republican United States Senator from Idaho.

Notes

References
 Obituaries & Death Notices

1868 births
1940 deaths
People from Washington County, Idaho
Idaho Democrats
People from Richland County, Ohio
People from Payette County, Idaho